is the debut album by Japanese singer Mari Hamada, released on April 21, 1983 by Invitation. Co-produced by Loudness drummer Munetaka Higuchi, the album was given the tag line:  by Shigesato Itoi. The songs were written and arranged by the Munetaka Higuchi Project Team, which consisted of Higuchi, Nobuo Yamada, Keiji Katayama, and Hiroaki Matsuzawa. The album was reissued alongside Hamada's past releases on January 15, 2014.

Track listing

Personnel 
 Kenji Kitajima – guitar
 Hiroaki Matsuzawa – guitar
 Shin Yuasa – guitar
 Hiro Nagasawa – bass
 Yuki Nakajima – keyboards
 Munetaka Higuchi – drums

References

External links 
  (Mari Hamada)
  (Victor Entertainment)
 
 

1983 debut albums
Japanese-language albums
Mari Hamada albums
Albums produced by Daiko Nagato
Victor Entertainment albums